Ptycholoma is a genus of moths in the tribe Archipini.

Species
Ptycholoma erschoffi (Christoph, 1877)
Ptycholoma imitator (Walsingham, 1900)
Ptycholoma lata L.S. Chen & Jinbo, 2009
Ptycholoma lecheana (Linnaeus, 1758)
Ptycholoma micantana (Kennel, 1901)

Former species
Ptycholoma circumclusna (Linnaeus, 1758) 
Ptycholoma peritana  (Clemens, 1860) 
Ptycholoma plumbeolana (Bremer, 1865)
Ptycholoma virescana  (Clemens, 1865)

Distribution
Species in this genus are present in most of Europe, in the eastern Palearctic realm, and in the Near East.

References

 Fauna europaea
 Biolib
 Funet
 , 1829, Syst. Cat. Br. Insects (2): 183.
 , 2005, World Catalogue of Insects 5.
 ; ;  2009: A new species of Ptycholoma (Lepidoptera: Tortricidae) from South China. Zootaxa, 2087: 65-68. Abstract & excerpt

External links
Tortricidae.com

External links

Archipini
Tortricidae genera